Desiderio Navarro Pérez was a Cuban art, culture and literature critic.

Career 
Navarro was born on May 13, 1948, in Camagüey, died in Havana on December 7, 2017. In the middle of the sixties he started to publish his first articles and studies in several Cuban and foreign magazines, in the field of literature, visual arts, aesthetics and cultural science.

In course of time his articles were published in magazines and papers in North and Latin America, and Europe. He has been a visiting professor at various universities and institutes in the world, and he organizes debates between international speakers. His books have been published in more than ten languages.

In 1972  he founded the journal Criterios, in 1994 the book series Criterios, and in 2011 the e-zine Denken Pensée Thought Mysl. Information Service on European Cultural Thought. In this leading magazine (cf. www.criterios.es) he brings together important essays from various languages on themes like aesthetics, literature, art and culture. Next to those, he writes articles himself as well.

He has translated from sixteen Romance, Germanic, Slavic and Uraloaltaic languages over 450 theoretical texts on literature, arts, culture and society. These translations have been published in Cuba, Spain and Mexico.

In 2003 he founded the Center for Cultural Theory Criterios (Havana).

Recognition 
In 1996 Navarro received a Guggenheim Fellowship. Furthermore, he received a grant from the Prince Claus Fund from the Netherlands twice, in 1999 and 2005, in order to be able to continue his project Criterios.

Furthermore, he was honored with a number of awards, of which the following is a (translated) selection:
1985:  Prize for Criticism of Visual Arts of Salón, (UNEAC, Union of Writers and Artists of Cuba)
1983 and 1988: National Prize of Literary Criticism Mirta Aguirre
1986 and 1991: Translation Prize for lifetime work (UNEAC)
1987: Critics National Prize, Ministry of Culture
1988: Award Reason to Be of the cultural center Alejo Carpentier
1989: Translation prize of the cultural center Juan Marinello
1989: Order of Cultural Merit, People's Republic of Poland
1995: Prize for the lifetime work in criticism, Argentine society for art critics
2003: Medal Alejo Carpentier of the State Council of Cuba
2006: National Editors' Prize of the Cuban Institute of the Book
2008  Distinction Polonicum, Center for Polish Culture and Language, Warsaw University
2009: Prince Claus Award, Prince Claus Fund, Netherlands

Works 
Navarro wrote and published the following books:
1986: Cultura y marxismo: Problemas y polémicas
1989: Ejercicios del criterio
2007: Las causas de las cosas
2008: A pe(n)sar de todo

Navarro has edited 22 anthologies of which the following is a selection. Some works have been reprinted several times.
1975: Cultura, ideología y sociedad
1981: Anatoli Lunacharski. Sobre cultura, arte y literatura
1986: Textos y contextos, t. I y II
1994: Patrice Pavis. El teatro y su recepción. Semiología, cruce de culturas y postmodernismo
1996: Iuri Lotman. La semiosfera, t. I, II y III
1997: Intertextualité. Francia en el origen de un término y el desarrollo de un concepto
2002: Image 1: Teoría francesa y francófona del lenguaje visual y pictórico
2004: Intertextualität 1:, Alemania en la teoría de la intertextualidad
2006: Stefan Morawski. De la estética a la filosofía de la cultura
2007: El Postmoderno, el postmodernismo y su crítica en Criterios
2008: Borís Groys. Obra de arte total Stalin. Topología del arte
2009: El pensamiento cultural ruso en Criterios
2011: Henryk Markiewicz. Los estudios literarios: conceptos, problemas, dilemas
2011: Wolfgang Welsch. Actualidad de la estética. Estética de la actualidad

References 

Cuban journalists
Male journalists
Cuban scientists
Cuban art critics
Cuban literary critics
Living people
1948 births
People from Camagüey